John Brook O'Donnell (c. 1902 – c. 1990) was a rugby union player who represented Australia. O'Donnell, a hooker, claimed a total of three international rugby caps for Australia.

References

Australian rugby union players
Australia international rugby union players
Year of death missing
Year of birth uncertain
Rugby union hookers